Vendia is a genus of oval-shaped, Ediacaran fossils ranging from 4.5 to 12.5 mm long. The body is completely segmented into isomers, which are arranged alternately in two rows longitudinal to the axis of the body. The larger isomers cover the smaller ones externally but the posterior ends of all the isomers remain free. The transverse elements decrease in size from anterior to posterior and are all inclined in the same direction.

The fossil bears a depression along a body that is interpreted as a digestive-distributive system that consists of a simple axial tube and short lateral appendages located along the borders between the isomers. Except for the first isomer of Vendia rachiata, all the isomers have one lateral appendage.

The first species, V. sokolovi, was originally found in a core from a Yarensk borehole in the south of Arkhangelsk Oblast of Russia in beginning of the 1960s  and was described by Boris Keller in 1969.

Three Vendia species have been described with the following differentiating characteristics:
 V. sokolovi, represented by only one specimen 11 mm long, has 7 segments per side.
 V. rachiata differs from V. sokolovi in the smaller number of isomers. The 12.5 mm long specimen has 5 isomers in one row, and in the length of isomers quickly decreasing posteriorly, and in the short lateral appendages of the axial depression. This species has been found only in the Solza River locality, Onega Peninsula of the White Sea area, Arkhangelsk Oblast.
 The third species, V. janae is reassigned to the separate genus Paravendia. It differs from the genus Vendia in the shape and relative position of the isomers that curve around and meet at the tail point, and larger isomers completely cover smaller ones. It is from Zimnie Gory locality, White Sea.

Vendia, Paravendia and probably Karakhtia are members of the Family Vendiidae, Class Vendiamorpha of the extinct Ediacaran (Vendian) animal Phylum Proarticulata.  The Charnwood Forest form, Pseudovendia charnwoodensis has been synonymized with the rangeomorph Charnia.

See also
 List of Ediacaran genera

References

Vendiamorpha
Ediacaran life
Fossils of Russia
White Sea fossils
Prehistoric bilaterian genera